Madra Mountains are in western Anatolia, Aegean Region of Turkey. They are horst type geological formation. The highest point of the mountains is Maya Hill.

Geography

They are located on the northern Aegean part of the western Anatolia and form the border of İzmir and Balikesir provinces of Turkey. In Balıkesir province they range on Ayvalık, Burhaniye, Havran and İvrindi district. In İzmir province they range on Bergama and Dikili district, in Manisa province only in Soma.

They are surrounded by the
Bakırçay Valley in south
Balıkesir plain and Kocadağ in north east
Edremit gulf and Edremit and Havran plain in north west
Ömer Mountain in east
Dikili Gulf in west.

There are Madra dam in the west and Kestel dam in the east of the mountains.

Economy and Tourism

In Kozak Plateau of Madra Mountains region pinus pinea production is essential. Also pavement stone production for roads is important. The region is also known for grape production.

Near Aşağıbey village there is ruins of ancient city of Perperene and near Yukarıbey village there is ancient Trarion.

References

Mountain ranges of Turkey
Aegean Region
Landforms of İzmir Province
Landforms of Balıkesir Province